The Medici Seal is a young adult novel written by Theresa Breslin, published in 2006. Set among the cultural life and political intrigues of Renaissance Italy, it is the story of a boy who initially calls himself Matteo and his master Leonardo da Vinci.

It was shortlisted for the 2007 Booktrust Teenage Prize and longlisted for the 2007 Carnegie Medal.

Plot introduction
Italy, 1502. Ten-year-old Matteo is saved from drowning by friends of Leonardo da Vinci. The artist and scholar takes the boy under his wing. Matteo accompanies him both as he pursues knowledge and paints magnificent pictures and as he travels across Italy. Soon his story continues. Serving Leonardo da Vinci, seeing first hand the ruthless rule of Cesare Borgia, the ambition of the Medici and the revenge of the dell'Orte. Florence, Milan, Castell Barta and many other places in Renaissance Italy.

References

2006 British novels
Scottish novels
British young adult novels
Children's historical novels
Novels set in the Renaissance
Novels about artists
Fiction set in the 1500s
Novels set in Italy
Cultural depictions of Leonardo da Vinci
Doubleday (publisher) books